Blue Rock Township is one of the twenty-five townships of Muskingum County, Ohio, United States.  The 2000 census found 641 people in the township.

Geography
Located on the southern edge of the county, it borders the following townships:
Salt Creek Township - north
Rich Hill Township - northeast corner
Meigs Township - east
Bristol Township, Morgan County - southeast corner
Bloom Township, Morgan County - south
Harrison Township - west
Wayne Township - northwest

No municipalities are located in Brush Creek Township, although the unincorporated community of Blue Rock lies in the western part of the township.

Name and history
Blue Rock Township took its name from Blue Rock Creek. It is the only Blue Rock Township statewide.

By the 1830s, Blue Rock Township had a sawmill and at least ten salt factories.

Government
The township is governed by a three-member board of trustees, who are elected in November of odd-numbered years to a four-year term beginning on the following January 1. Two are elected in the year after the presidential election and one is elected in the year before it. There is also an elected township fiscal officer, who serves a four-year term beginning on April 1 of the year after the election, which is held in November of the year before the presidential election. Vacancies in the fiscal officership or on the board of trustees are filled by the remaining trustees.

References

External links
County website

Townships in Muskingum County, Ohio
Townships in Ohio